The Groundstar Conspiracy is a 1972 American neo noir crime film directed by Lamont Johnson. It stars George Peppard and Michael Sarrazin.

Douglas Heyes' screenplay (written under his frequent pseudonym, Matthew Howard) was adapted very freely from L. P. Davies' 1968 novel, The Alien. It was filmed in Vancouver, British Columbia, and produced by Hal Roach Productions in Canada.

Plot 
Employee John Welles attempts to steal rocket booster plans from the Groundstar facility. His attempt goes awry and he is badly disfigured in an explosion and barely escapes. He stumbles to the home of Nicole Devon, and collapses. She calls an ambulance, the authorities are alerted, and soon Welles is operated on, given plastic surgery and interrogated by a hard-boiled government official named Tuxan, but Welles claims to have no memory of his crime. In fact, he claims no memory of his life at all, save for brief dream-like flashes of a woman on a beach and the ruins of a Greek temple.
  
Despite Tuxan's brutal interrogation techniques, consisting of electro-shock and water submersion, Welles still maintains his story of total amnesia. Tuxan allows Welles to escape, hoping he will lead them to the people behind the attempted theft. Welles goes to Nicole's home and begs her to help him remember, but she knows nothing.  They fall in love as Tuxan keeps them under surveillance.

Eventually, the conspirators behind the attempted theft are found and Tuxan reveals the truth to Welles, who still cannot remember any details of the crime. John Welles actually died following surgery the day after the Groundstar explosion. The man we have come to know as Welles is really Peter Bellamy, a government employee whose girlfriend recently drowned in Greece.  Bellamy, feeling that life was no longer worth living or remembering, volunteered to have his memory wiped and to play Welles in order to draw the conspirators into the open.

Cast
George Peppard as Tuxan
Michael Sarrazin as John Welles / Peter Bellamy
Christine Belford as Nicole Devon
Cliff Potts as Carl Mosely
James Olson as Senator Stanton
Tim O'Connor as Frank Gossage
James McEachin as Bender
Alan Oppenheimer as General Hackett

Production
The film was based on the 1968 novel The Alien by L. P. Davies. Universal bought film rights in June 1968 prior to publication and assigned Dick Berg to produce. Douglas Heyes was to have filmed the work under the title The Alien starring Robert Stack, Geneviève Bujold and David Janssen, but Bujold leaving the project led to delays in shooting and a new cast.

In July 1971 Universal announced that Michael Sarrazin and George Peppard would star in a film version called The Plastic Man. It would be directed by Lamont Johnson and be a co production between Universal and Hal Roach Productions.

Filming started in Vancouver, Canada on 2 August 1971 with Carol White as the female lead. Shortly into filming White asked to be released and was replaced by Christine Belford. White wanted to go because a production delay meant she was in danger of missing the start date on Made. (Candice Bergen and Tuesday Weld were offered the role but asked for too much money.) All White's footage had to be reshot.

Peppard was paid $400,000.

The film was shot at the Burnaby campus of Simon Fraser University and the Panorama Mountain Resort.

References

External links

1972 films
Films directed by Lamont Johnson
Universal Pictures films
1970s crime films
1970s mystery films
1970s crime thriller films
1970s romantic thriller films
1970s action films
1970s science fiction action films
1970s English-language films